National Park is a small town on the North Island Central Plateau in New Zealand. Also known as National Park Village, it is the highest urban township in New Zealand, at 825 metres. Its name derives from its location just outside the boundary of Tongariro National Park, New Zealand's first national park, and its only national park from its creation in 1887 until 1900.
The village has great views of Mount Tongariro, Mount Ngauruhoe (Mount Doom in the Lord of the Rings film trilogy), and Mount Ruapehu.
  
The town is sited next to the North Island Main Trunk railway line and close to the junction of State Highways 4 and 47, halfway between Raetihi and Taumarunui and 45 kilometres southwest of the southern shore of Lake Taupō. It is 20 minutes drive to the country's biggest skifields, Whakapapa and 50 minutes drive to Turoa on the slopes of the active volcano, Mount Ruapehu. To the west is Whanganui National Park.

The town is administered by the Ruapehu District Council. One councillor is elected for the National Park Ward, and there is a National Park Community Board. On a national level, National Park is part of the  general electorate and the  Māori electorate.

Tourism is its main industry, with 1,500 visitor beds in commercial accommodation and private chalets. In the summer the village is a popular base for Tongariro and Whanganui National Park for hiking, biking and kayaking. National Park Village. Transport leaves daily (weather permitting) for the Tongariro Alpine Crossing, known as the best one day alpine trek in New Zealand.

KiwiRail's Northern Explorer scheduled passenger service stopped at the National Park Railway Station on its journey between Auckland and Wellington up until its suspension in December 2021. There is a licensed cafe on the platform. To the northwest of the town the railway track performs the convoluted dance that is the Raurimu Spiral, one of New Zealand's most impressive feats of engineering.

Originally the town was known as Waimarino (calm waters). In 1926 the New Zealand Railways renamed the railway station as National Park. This was to avoid confusion with other Waimarino entities, and also the name had come into common usage from its location close to Tongariro National Park. This change has since been confusing, as there are many National Parks in New Zealand.

The opening of the Main Trunk line in 1908 created a vast opportunity to log and mill the large trees in the native forests, with 30 saw mills and associated bush tramways established in the National Park area alone. With the arrival of caterpillar tractors in the 1930s the extraction process was accelerated with National Park station having one of the greatest throughputs of timber in New Zealand. Today Tongariro Timber is the last surviving mill operating at National Park.

In the 1960s National Park became the railhead for all the heavy equipment and machinery for the Tongariro Power Scheme Development with local pumice roads substantially upgraded to take the heavy traffic.

National Park School was established in 1925. Its fortunes have fluctuated with the cycles of activity in the area. Today it is thriving with a more stable population and the establishment of its Ski Elite programme whereby pupils take can up residence in the village for the winter combining studies with skiing and snowboarding development programmes.

Climate
Under the Köppen-Geiger climate classification, National Park has an oceanic climate (Cfb). February is the warmest month, with an average 
temperature of 14.8 °C, while July is the coldest month with an average temperature of 4.5 °C. Due to an altitude of 822 metres, winters are cold, and generally winter afternoons stay below 10 °C. Frosts are common from May to September, although they can occur during the warmer months. Snow is also a common occurrence in the colder months, sometimes accumulating for several days on end. The summer temperatures are also stunted due to the village's altitude, resulting in cool nights and mild to warm days. The mountains around the village are popular for hiking and mountain biking during the summer. The summer afternoon temperatures often exceed 20 °C, and sometimes reaching 25 °C. The wettest month is July, with 225 mm of precipitation, while February is the driest, with an average of 115 mm, making the climate of National Park lean towards a cool-summer Mediterranean climate (Csb).  Overall, the year-round average temperature is 9.6 °C.

Demographics

The population of National Park settlement was 213 in the 2018 New Zealand census, an increase of 39 (22.4%) since the 2013 census, and a decrease of 27 (-11.3%) since the 2006 census. There were 111 males and 99 females, giving a sex ratio of 1.12 males per female. Ethnicities were 165 people  (77.5%) European/Pākehā, 54 (25.4%) Māori, 3 (1.4%) Pacific peoples, and 15 (7.0%) Asian (totals add to more than 100% since people could identify with multiple ethnicities). Of the total population, 39 people  (18.3%) were under 15 years old, 36 (16.9%) were 15–29, 117 (54.9%) were 30–64, and 21 (9.9%) were over 65.

National Park statistical area

The National Park statistical area, which also includes Ōwhango, had a population of 1,050 at the 2018 New Zealand census, a decrease of 15 people (-1.4%) since the 2013 census, and a decrease of 81 people (-7.2%) since the 2006 census. There were 411 households. There were 534 males and 516 females, giving a sex ratio of 1.03 males per female. The median age was 41.3 years (compared with 37.4 years nationally), with 225 people (21.4%) aged under 15 years, 159 (15.1%) aged 15 to 29, 519 (49.4%) aged 30 to 64, and 147 (14.0%) aged 65 or older.

Ethnicities were 86.0% European/Pākehā, 20.0% Māori, 1.4% Pacific peoples, 2.9% Asian, and 2.0% other ethnicities (totals add to more than 100% since people could identify with multiple ethnicities).

The proportion of people born overseas was 15.4%, compared with 27.1% nationally.

Although some people objected to giving their religion, 56.9% had no religion, 30.6% were Christian, 0.9% were Hindu, 0.3% were Buddhist and 4.6% had other religions.

Of those at least 15 years old, 132 (16.0%) people had a bachelor or higher degree, and 162 (19.6%) people had no formal qualifications. The median income was $30,800, compared with $31,800 nationally. The employment status of those at least 15 was that 480 (58.2%) people were employed full-time, 129 (15.6%) were part-time, and 18 (2.2%) were unemployed.

Education

References

Geography of Manawatū-Whanganui
Populated places in Manawatū-Whanganui
Ruapehu District